Howard Watts III (born December 14, 1987) is an American politician serving as a member of the Nevada Assembly from the 15th district. Elected in 2018, he assumed office in 2019.

Early life and education

Watts was born in Las Vegas, Nevada in 1987. He earned a Bachelor of Arts degree in political science from the University of Nevada, Las Vegas in 2011.

Career

In 2018, Watts ran for election to represent the 15th district in the Nevada Assembly to replace Elliot Anderson, who was not seeking re-election. He won a five-way Democratic primary with 45.7% of the vote, and won the general election with 66.5% of the vote.

Tenure 
Watts sits on the following Assembly committees:
 Growth and Infrastructure
 Judiciary
 Natural Resources, Agriculture, and Mining

Watts is running for re-election in 2020, and will face Burke Andersson in the Democratic primary.

Electoral record

References

Democratic Party members of the Nevada Assembly
1987 births
Living people
21st-century American politicians
Politicians from Las Vegas
University of Nevada, Las Vegas alumni